Patrick Daniel Gaffney (born 1947) is an American anthropologist, academic, translator, member of the Congregation of Holy Cross and the current Vice-Chancellor of Notre Dame University Bangladesh.

Education and career 
He earned his PhD from the University of Chicago and has taught at the University of Notre Dame, USA, since 1980. For his academic work, he received Kaneb Teaching Award in 2001, and Reinhold Niebuhr Award in 2002. A polyglot fluent in Arabic, French, German, Dutch, Spanish, Italian, Russian, and a competent reader in Latin, Greek, Hebrew, Gaffney translated Renaissance of the East by Hans Fortmann in 1972 and With Open Hands by Henri Nouwen in 1973 from Dutch into English. An expert on Islam and Islamic culture, Gaffney authored The Prophet's Pulpit: Islamic Preaching in Contemporary Egypt in 1994 and co-authored Breaking Cycles of Violence: Conflict Prevention and Intrastate Crises in 1999.

Works 

 The Prophet's Pulpit: Islamic Preaching in Contemporary Egypt (1994)
 Breaking Cycles of Violence: Conflict Prevention and Intrastate Crises (1999, co-author)

Translations 

 Renaissance of the East (originally by Hans Fortmann)
 With Open Hands (originally by Henri Nouwen)

References

1947 births
Living people
American Roman Catholic priests
University of Chicago alumni
University of Notre Dame alumni
University of Notre Dame faculty
Congregation of Holy Cross
American scholars of Islam